Șoldănești is a district in the north-east of Moldova, with the administrative center at Șoldănești.
As of 1 January 2011, its population was 43,300.

History
Localities with the earliest documentary attestation are Dobrusa, Olişcani, Răspopeni, Salcia are certified in period 1437–1448. In the 16th–18th centuries, continued economic development (trade, crafts), cultural (build churches, monasteries) and has been a marked increase in the population. Since late 18th and early 19th century, the region's economic decay occurs as a result of the constant wars led by Poland, the Ottoman Empire and Russian Empire for influence in the region. In 1812 Treaty of Bucharest divides Basarabia from the Principality of Moldova, the first being ceded to Russia. In 1918, after the collapse of the Russian Empire, Basarabia decide union with the motherland Romania, during this period (1918–1944) district, is part of Soroca County. Basarabia is again busy this time of the USSR after the Molotov-Ribbentrop Treaty. In 1991 as a result of the proclamation of Independence of Moldova, part of the Soroca County (1991–2003), and in 2003 became administrative unit of Moldova.

Geography

Soldanesti district is located in north-eastern of Moldova, is the neighborhood north and west Florești District, in the north-east Camenca District, in east Rîbnița District, south Telenești and Rezina districts. The territory is located within the Plateau of Nistru, the relief is moderately, fragmented and represented by plateaus, low hills and dales wide and hilly interfluvial shaped strings. Sometimes come across isolated dome-shaped hills. On the plateau are widespread erosion and landslides. In the district high fertility soils are characterized by particularly prevalent in typical chernozem, leachates, and carbonated ordinary, gray and brown soil of forest closed. Average reliability of the soil according to the Land Register of the Republic of Moldova is 74-point average of districts of 63 points. Maximum altitude in district is the hill Zahorna, with 338 meters.

Climate
The climate is temperate continental, average temperature of January −4.50 °C, 21.00 °C in July, the average annual precipitation is 500–560 mm. Average wind speed 4–6 m\s.

Fauna
The fauna of the district is typical of Central Europe is characterized by: foxes, hedgehogs, hares, wild boars, deer, wildcats and wolves. Of birds there are: quail, egrets, hawks, storks, crows, seagulls and others.

Flora
Forests occupy 19.3% of the district and are complemented by oak, ash, lime, hornbeam, acacia and others. Plants include: nettle, fescue, clover, wormwood, bells and others.

Natural resources
The main mineral resources located in the district stands metallic resources, most of the stock is near the Mihuleni – limestone. Olişcani deposits – gravel. Soldanesti, Olişcani, Mihuleni, Vadul Raşcov – clay. Alcedar, Dobruşa, Răspopeni – sand.

Rivers
The district is located in the Nistru River basin, the river Ciorna is the main river in the district. You meet many sources of drinking water, groundwater is at depths between 0.5 m and 10–15 m.

Administrative subdivisions
Localities: 33
Administrative center: Soldanesti
Cities: Soldanesti
Villages: 10
Communes: 22

Demographics
1 January 2012 the district population was 43,000 of which 17.5% urban and 82.5% rural population.
Births (2010): 536 (12.3 per 1000)
Deaths (2010): 720 (16.6 per 1000)
Growth Rate (2010): -184 (−4.2 per 1000)

Ethnic groups 

Footnote: * There is an ongoing controversy regarding the ethnic identification of Moldovans and Romanians.

Religion 
Christians – 98.9%
Orthodox Christians – 98.2%
Protestant – 0.7%
Seventh-day Adventists – 0.3%
Pentecostals – 0.2%
Baptists – 0.1
Evangelicals – 0.1%
Other – 0.8%
No Religion – 0.3%

Economy
Being a predominantly agricultural district, the main efforts are focused on supporting and developing priority directions of agriculture. Arable land constitutes – 32 351 ha (54.4%), perennial plantations – 3544 ha (5.9%), pastures – 4761 ha (8.0%). Industrial enterprises of all types of ownership manufactured in January–September 2010 production of 6.846 million lei worth at current prices. The volume index of industrial production from January–September 2009 was (in comparable prices) 96.6%.

Education
In district 31 educational institutions working with a number of 5242 students. Currently in educational institutions operating in the district 509 teachers. Preschool –
28, children in kindergarten – 1458, teachers – 152.

Politics
Soldanesti district is a district with a preponderance of right-wing parties. AEI get good results here, but PCRM is in a constant percentage decrease. During 2001–2009, the district was a predominantly communist (over 50%). District is one of the founding members of Euroregion Dniester.

During the last three elections AEI had an increase of 76.6%

Elections

|-
!style="background-color:#E9E9E9" align=center colspan=2 valign=center|Parties and coalitions
!style="background-color:#E9E9E9" align=right|Votes
!style="background-color:#E9E9E9" align=right|%
!style="background-color:#E9E9E9" align=right|+/−
|-
| 
|align=left|Party of Communists of the Republic of Moldova
|align="right"|8,145
|align="right"|40.95
|align="right"|−3.95
|-
| 
|align=left|Liberal Democratic Party of Moldova
|align="right"|6,310
|align="right"|31.72
|align="right"|+17.91
|-
| 
|align=left|Democratic Party of Moldova
|align="right"|2,486
|align="right"|12,50
|align="right"|-0.16
|-
| 
|align=left|Liberal Party
|align="right"|1,239
|align="right"|6.23
|align="right"|−2.27
|-
|bgcolor=#0033cc|
|align=left|European Action Movement
|align="right"|408
|align="right"|2.05
|align="right"|+2.05
|-
| 
|align=left|Party Alliance Our Moldova
|align="right"|347
|align="right"|1.74
|align="right"|−12.39
|-
| 
|align=left|Christian Democratic People's Party
|align="right"|313
|align="right"|1.57
|align="right"|−2.58
|-
|bgcolor="grey"|
|align=left|Other Party
|align="right"|650
|align="right"|3.24
|align="right"|+1.39
|-
|align=left style="background-color:#E9E9E9" colspan=2|Total (turnout 60.94%)
|width="30" align="right" style="background-color:#E9E9E9"|20,082
|width="30" align="right" style="background-color:#E9E9E9"|100.00
|width="30" align="right" style="background-color:#E9E9E9"|

Culture
The district works: amateur artistic groups – 124, of which 13 bands as "model", public libraries – 34 of them five children, schools of music – 2, the school district fine arts – 1. 82 craftsmen working in the district of its four members of the craftsmen.

Health
Works: a hospital with general fund of 135 beds, the center of family doctor in the composition of which are 12 family physician offices, 3 health centers, two health centers and 7 autonomous health offices.

Personalities
 
 
 Andrei Lupan – Writer, politician and chairman of Moldovan Writers' Union (1946–1955; 1958–1961).
 Dumitru Matcovschi – Writer and member of the Academy of Sciences of Moldova, He was a founder of the Popular Front of Moldova
 Mihai Volontir – Actor
 Simeon G. Murafa – Politician and director of the newspaper Cuvânt moldovenesc
 Teofil Ioncu – Basarabian politician

References

 
Districts of Moldova